Alonzaville is an unincorporated community in Shenandoah County, Virginia, United States. Alonzaville lies at the crossroads of Virginia Secondary Routes 623 and 604. According to the Geographic Names Information System, Alonzaville has also been known as Alonzoville and Alorzaville.

Unincorporated communities in Shenandoah County, Virginia
Unincorporated communities in Virginia